Royal Citadel may refer to:

Royal Citadel, Plymouth, a fort in Plymouth, England
Real Cittadella, a fort in Messina, Sicily